The Al Kandari family is a large family in Kuwait. They are of Sunni Muslim Larestani ancestry. The Al Kandari family is not a tribe; as each family may have different ancestors. Therefore the Al Kandari family is simply a sizable family with various sub-families, or families closely related to the Al Kandari family. 

Notable members of the family now include Mohammed Al-Kandari, a member of Kuwait National Assembly; Anas Al Kandari, a militant who died fighting United States Marines on Failaka Island; and Abdullah Kamel Al Kandari and Fayiz Al Kandari, two Kuwaitis who claimed to have traveled to Afghanistan to provide humanitarian aid, who ended up being sent to the Guantanamo Bay detention camp, in part, because their names, or "known aliases" were found on a "list of 324 names" analysts found suspicious. Fayiz Al Kandari was among the two dozen Guantanamo captives to face charges before a Guantanamo military commission.

Mohammed Al Kandari was first elected in 2008. Anas Al Kandari was killed in October 2002, on Failaka Island, an island off Kuwait's coast. US Marines there on a training exercise were fired upon by Anas Al Kandari and Jassem al-Hajiri. Lance Corporal Antonio J. Sledd was killed and another Marine was injured in the incident. Jassem al-Hajiri was also killed.

Abdullah Kamel Al Kandari was repatriated to Kuwait on September 9, 2006. He faced charges in Kuwatit after he was repatriated, and was acquitted.

References

Society of Kuwait